The Southend-on-Sea lifeboat station is a lifeboat station at Southend-on-Sea in the English county of Essex, operated by the Royal National Lifeboat Institution (RNLI).

Because of the large tidal range and extensive drying foreshore at Southend, the lifeboat station uses two boathouses. The other boathouse is situated adjacent to the inshore end of the pier, and houses a second D class lifeboat together with a H class hovercraft, both of which are launched down an adjacent slipway.

The pier-head lifeboat house is a modern structure, which incorporates crew accommodation and offices, an RNLI shop, and a viewing gallery from which visitors can view the lifeboats. It is topped by a sun deck to which the public have access. Lifeboat crews use an electric buggy, complete with sirens and blue flashing lights, to access this boathouse along the pier from the shore.

History

 
The lifeboat station was first established in 1879, and was launched from davits on the pier in a similar manner to today. Between 1885 and 1891 there was a second station on the mainland, with the boat launched by horse-drawn carriage. The first motor lifeboat arrived in 1928. In 1935, a new lifeboat house and slipway was erected at the pier head. In 1940, the lifeboat Greater London was one of the 19 lifeboats which assisted in the evacuation of Dunkirk.

In 1955 what would prove to be Southend's final all-weather lifeboat went on station. From then until 1968, the Thames estuary was covered by three similar slipway launched 46ft 9in Watsons stationed on seaside piers at Clacton on Sea, Southend on Sea and Margate. Clacton's Watson was replaced by a 37ft  in 1968 and the following year a new lifeboat station was opened at Sheerness on the opposite side of the Thames estuary to Southend. By the late 1960s, inflatable inshore lifeboats were in use at Southend to provide assistance to the increasing number of pleasure craft. In 1974, Sheerness was allocated a fast  boat and two years later Southend's all weather Watson class lifeboat was withdrawn and replaced by the inshore Atlantic 21 class Percy Garon. This was initially kept in the 1935 pier head boathouse, but in 1986 the coaster Kings Abbey sliced through the pier and lifeboat slipway, badly damaging the lifeboat house. A temporary station was quickly re-established at the pierhead, and officially opened in 1991. This temporary station was used until 2002, when today's modern boathouse was opened.

In 2014, a new shore boathouse was completed to accommodate the new hovercraft, Vera Ravine, that was placed in service.

References

External links

Web page on the Southend-on-Sea lifeboat station from the RNLI web site
Web site of the Southend-on-Sea lifeboat station

Lifeboat stations in Essex
Buildings and structures in Southend-on-Sea
1879 establishments in England